The Palm Hills International Tennis Challenger is a professional tennis tournament played on outdoor red clay courts. It is currently part of the Association of Tennis Professionals (ATP) Challenger Tour. It is held annually in Cairo, Egypt, since 1983.

Results

Singles

Doubles

References
 ATP Results Archive

ATP Challenger Tour
Clay court tennis tournaments
Tennis tournaments in Egypt